Allengunj also spelt Allenganj, is a locality (township) of Allahabad, Uttar Pradesh, India. It is adjacent to the University of Allahabad.

References 

Neighbourhoods in Allahabad